The El Salvador national under 21 football team, is the national under-21 football team of El Salvador and is controlled by the Federación Salvadoreña de Fútbol. The team competes in the international under-21 and youth football competitions. They compete for qualification to the Central American and Caribbean Games.

History

2010 FIFA suspension
On 11 May 2010, the FIFA Emergency Committee suspended the Salvadoran Football Association (FESFUT) on account of government interference. This decision by FIFA was based on the fact that the statutes ratified by the FESFUT general assembly in August 2009 had not been formally entered in the country's official register, and that the government had failed to acknowledge the authority of the Normalisation Committee set up to represent FESFUT.

On 25 May, El Salvador, which had qualified for both of the men's and women's 2010 Central American and Caribbean Games, were disqualified and be not included in the draw due to its suspension by FIFA over governmental interference in the affairs of the country's soccer federation.

On 7 June, the CONCACAF lifted the ban, and allowed the male & female U-21 teams to participate once again in the CAC games.

Fixtures and results

Players

Current squad

Coaching staff

Coaching history

 Mauricio Rodriguez (1973)
 Julio Contreras Cardona (1977)
 Paulo Roberto Cabrera (1986)
 Juan Ramón Paredes (2002)
 Mauricio Alfaro (2006-2014)
 Eduardo Lara (2017)
 Alexsander Rodríguez (2018) 
 Edgar Henríquez (2023–present)

See also
 El Salvador national football team
 El Salvador national under-17 football team
 El Salvador national under-20 football team
 El Salvador national under-23 football team
 Federación Salvadoreña de Fútbol

References

under-21
National under-21 association football teams